Stoddart Campbell (19 September 1846 – 2 September 1903) was an Australian cricketer. He played eleven first-class cricket matches for Victoria between 1866 and 1876.

See also
 List of Victoria first-class cricketers

References

1846 births
1903 deaths
Australian cricketers
Victoria cricketers
Cricketers from Melbourne